Alcmena is a genus of jumping spiders. The genus was first described by Carl Ludwig Koch in 1846 based on the species Alcmena psittacina and Alcmena amabilis. The genus consists of four species endemic to North and South America. A fifth species, Alcmena trifasciata, was described by Caporiacco in 1954, but declared a nomen dubium by Ruiz and Brescovit in 2008.

Name
The genus name is derived from Alcmene, the mother of Heracles in Greek mythology.

Species
 Alcmena amabilis C. L. Koch, 1846 – Mexico
 Alcmena psittacina C. L. Koch, 1846 – Brazil
 Alcmena tristis Mello-Leitão, 1945 – Argentina
 Alcmena vittata Karsch, 1880 – Venezuela

References 

  (2011): The world spider catalog, version 11.5. American Museum of Natural History.

Salticidae genera
Spiders of Mexico
Spiders of South America
Salticidae